
A bibliography of books related to the Vale of Glamorgan, south Wales.

General

Architecture

Culture

Geography

History

Photographic

Barry

Cowbridge

Dinas Powys

Llanharry

Llantwit Major

Penarth and Sully

St Donats

Wenvoe

Vale of Glamorgan
Bibliographies of Wales